There have been at least two vessels that have served with the Brazilian Navy named Barroso, after Francisco Manuel Barroso, Baron of Amazonas:

,  an armoured gunboat built in the mid-1860s, decommissioned in 1882, and scrapped in 1937
, a 2002 corvette, the lead ship of its class

See also

Brazilian Navy ship names